This is a list of Iran women's international footballers – Iranian association football players who have played for the Iran women's national football team.

Players

See also
Iran women's national football team
Football Federation Islamic Republic of Iran
Football in Iran

References

 
Iran
Association football player non-biographical articles